"Давай держаться за руки" (Davay derzhat'sya za ruki; English: Let's Hold Hands) is the seventh single performed by Russian girl group Serebro and written by Maxim Fadeev. The song is included on the group's second album (Mama Lover).

Background
Maxim Fadeev, Serebro's manager, composed the song and co-wrote it with band member Olga Seryabkina. The demo version was released on November 4, 2010 through YouTube. Unlike previous Russian songs released by Serebro, an English version was not made available until the release of their second album where 'Angel Kiss' was released.

Music video

The music video for "Давай держаться за руки" was directed by Yuri Kurokhtin. The video featured the band members performing nude, and in some scenes wearing white catsuits, against various white backgrounds. At the end of the video all three members walk down a white hallway before the video fades to black.

Ello hosted the music video worldwide on 20 February 2011. The video was scheduled to be released on TV channel Europa Plus on 1 March 2011. The video also featured in Russia's most watched TV channels. 
A remix from DJ MIV was released for the House Megamix 2010 vol. 2.

The video is Serebro's second most watched on YouTube, with more than 1,900,000 views as of June 2012.

Track listing
Digital download
(Released on 1 November 2010)

"Давай держаться за руки (Lets Hold Hands)" - 4:17

Other versions/remixes

"Давай держаться за руки (Dj MIV Remix)" - 4:40
"Давай держаться за руки (Extended Edit)" - 6:15
"Давай держаться за руки (Version II)" - 5:02
"Давай держаться за руки (Dubsteb version)" - 3:48

Chart performance
The song debuted in Russia at number 108, later peaking at number 3 becoming the band's seventh top 10 single. The song has also peaked at number 18 in Ukraine and number 7 in Latvia.

Chart peaks and positions

Personnel
Anastasia Karpova – vocals
Elena Temnikova – vocals
Olga Seryabkina – vocals, lyrics
Maxim Fadeev – songwriting, producer

References

External links
 Official Website

2010 singles
Serebro songs
Eurodance songs
Songs written by Maxim Fadeev
Songs written by Olga Seryabkina
2010 songs
Russian-language songs